Dillenia alata, commonly known as red beech, golden guinea flower or golden guinea tree, is a tree in the Dilleniaceae family, found in tropical forests of the Moluccas, New Guinea, and northern Australia.

Description

The inflorescence is a raceme of 2-4 flowers borne on the twigs, either terminally or more or less opposed to the leaves.

Fruits are a red dehiscent capsule with a persistent green calyx and up to 8 valves (segments of the ovary) which open widely on maturity, revealing a number of  black seeds enclosed in a waxy white aril.

Taxonomy
The species was originally named Wormia alata by the Scottish botanist Robert Brown, and later formally described in 1817 by the Swiss botanist Augustin Pyramus de Candolle. His description was based on plant material collected by Joseph Banks at Point Lookout, Endeavour River, during James Cook's first voyage of discovery in 1770.

The species was transferred to the genus Dillenia by Italian botanist Ugolino Martelli in 1886.

Etymology
The genus name Dillenia was given in honour of the German-born botanist Johann Jacob Dillenius. The species epithet, alata, is derived from the Latin  and means "winged", referring to the winged petioles.

Distribution and habitat
The species is native to the Maluku Islands, New Guinea, and the Torres Strait islands, the Northern Territory, and  Queensland in Australia. It usually grows in rainforest but may be found in monsoon forest and even open forest (in wet situations).

Ecology
This species is host to the Queensland moth Pollanisus commoni, and the fruits are eaten by the Eclectus parrot.

Conservation
D. alata is assessed as least concern by the IUCN, the Northern Territory Government and the Queensland Government.

Cultivation
This species has "considerable horticultural merit", and the Australian botanist  David L. Jones, in his book Rainforest Plants of Australia, said "A striking ornamental, common along stream banks and in swampy soils. The leaves, bark, flowers and fruit are all highly decorative features".

Gallery

References

External links
 
 
 Map of observations of Dillenia alata at the Australasian Virtual Herbarium.

alata
Flora of New Guinea
Flora of the Northern Territory
Flora of Queensland
Plants described in 1886
Taxa named by Ugolino Martelli